The Ring, also known as Danielle Steel's The Ring, is a 1996 American made-for-television romantic drama film directed by Armand Mastroianni and written by Danielle Steel, based on her 1981 novel of the same name. It stars Nastassja Kinski and Michael York.

Plot 
During World War II, a young aristocratic German woman, Ariana von Gotthardt, is separated from her family and imprisoned. After being freed she falls in love with military officer Manfredd von Tripp, of a similar aristocratic background, and they get married. When Berlin falls to the Soviets and her husband is killed, she flees to the United States carrying his unborn child, not giving up hope that she will find her family, which is tied together by her mother's ring.

actors list 
 Nastassja Kinski as Ariana von Gotthard
 Linda Lavin as Ruth Liebman
 Michael York as Walmar von Gotthard
 Jon Tenney as Paul Liebman
 Tim DeKay as Max Thomas
 James B. Sikking as Sam Liebman
 Leslie Caron as Madame de Saint Marne
 Jean Marsh
 Rupert Penry-Jones as Gerhard von Gotthard
 Carsten Norgaard as Captain Manfred Von Tripp
 Leigh Lawson
 Julie Cox as Giselle
 Alessandro Nivola 
 Elizabeth Barondes as Tammy Liebman
 Sheila Allen as Frau Hedwig

External links 
 

1996 television films
1996 romantic drama films
1996 films
American romantic drama films
Films directed by Armand Mastroianni
American World War II films
Films shot in the Czech Republic
Films shot in Switzerland
Stillking Films films
Films based on works by Danielle Steel
1990s American films